Graham David Scott (born 10 October 1968) is an English professional football referee who officiates in the Premier League.

Education
He was educated at Abingdon School from 1980 until 1987 and the London School of Economics.

Football career
Scott played football at youth as a goalkeeper for Abingdon Town. A long-term back injury was a persistent problem; fearing permanent damage, he retired from playing competitive football at the age of 27.

He started refereeing in 1997, originally at lower-league level and harbouring little serious ambition of progressing to the highest echelon of football officiating. However, following positive feedback from players he decided to take the role more seriously. He joined the National List of referees in 2008, officiating many important games, including Crawley Town's upset of Bolton in the 2012–13 Football League Cup. In November 2014 he officiated his first Premier League match, between Burnley and Aston Villa.

In 2015, he was promoted to the Select Group of Referees, who officiate the matches in the Premier League, replacing long-time referee Chris Foy. In 2016, former referee Keith Hackett suggested that this promotion was "a mistake". The PGMOL sought to demote Scott at the end of the 2016–17 season after he refereed just eight Premier League matches all season  – of the 19 Select Group referees, only Lee Probert refereed fewer matches. However, Scott appealed against his demotion and retained his place for the 2017–18 season. A number of improved performances has led to him to officiate an increased number of matches, with 13 Premier League matches and an EFL League Cup semi-final by the end of January 2018. He has established a reputation for consistent game management, as well as actively discouraging time-wasting, diving, and dissent, which has garnered some praise from football pundits and journalists.

See also
 List of Old Abingdonians

References

1968 births
Living people
English football referees
People educated at Abingdon School
People from Oxfordshire
Premier League referees